Abdallah ibn Qais (Κάϊσος, Kaisos and , Abdelas in Greek sources) was an Umayyad military leader active against the Byzantine Empire in the 670s. In ca. 672/673 he led a raid into Cilicia and Lycia, and wintered there before returning to Syria. In 674/675, by which time, according to al-Tabari, he was admiral-in-chief of the Umayyad navy, he led a raid against the island of Crete along with general Fadala ibn Ubayd.

Sources 
 

7th-century births
Arab generals
Admirals of the medieval Islamic world
Umayyad people of the Arab–Byzantine wars
Generals of the Umayyad Caliphate
Year of death unknown
7th-century Arabs